Elizabeth Moir School is a co-educational, international day school, located on two campuses in Colombo, Sri Lanka, which welcomes children of all nationalities aged between 2-18. It is the only international school in Sri Lanka to be owned and run by British Nationals. Since the school started in 1996, it has welcomed students from over 74 different countries. Currently approximately 45% of the students are from the host country and the balance 55% are migrants.

History
Elizabeth Moir moved to Sri Lanka in 1982 with her husband and three children. Having been associated with international schools in Hong Kong and New Delhi, she founded Colombo International School months after arriving in Colombo, followed by the British School in Colombo some years later.

In 1996, she founded the Elizabeth Moir School, where she is currently the principal.

Students and Staff
There are approximately 520 students at the school at present, of whom 70% are from Sri Lanka, and 30% are expatriates.

The teachers who are from over 14 different countries have degrees from universities throughout the world, including Oxford, Cambridge, Imperial College, Harvard and Yale.

Curriculum
 Elizabeth Moir School uses the British education system. Students sit for IGCSE and Advanced Level examinations, set by Edexcel in Sri Lanka, and have had the best results of any international school outside the United Kingdom in both 2015 at Advanced Level, with 38% A* and in 2016 at IGCSE, with 64% A*.

Since the school’s inception, students have been awarded places at Oxford, Cambridge, Imperial College, LSE, Harvard, Stanford, Princeton, Cornell, Berkeley and have gained places, sometimes with full scholarships to many other top universities around the world.

Junior School 

The Junior School classes are: Early Learners, Pre KG, KG1, KG2 and Junior 1-5. In the Infant Classes children learn mainly through play. Literacy and Numeracy are the main focus of the curriculum throughout the whole Junior School, while ICT, Science, History, Geography, Art, Music and Movement, Drama, PE and Swimming are given equal prominence. The latest British text books, course content and methods of teaching are used for every subject.

Senior School 

The Senior School classes are: Form 1-5, Lower 6th and Upper 6th. In Form 4, students begin the IGCSE courses and they sit the examinations which are set by Edexcel and are marked in London in usually eight to ten subjects. Courses available are, English Language, English Literature, Mathematics, Further Mathematics, Physics, Chemistry, Biology, Human Biology, History, Geography, ICT, Mandarin, French, Sinhala, Tamil and Art. In the Lower 6th students begin the Advanced Level and they sit the examinations, which are set and marked by Edexcel, in three, four or five subjects. Courses  taught at this level are Mathematics, Further Mathematics, Computer Science, Physics, Chemistry, Biology, History, English Literature, Geography and Economics.

Sports
Elizabeth Moir School has a very keen Sports Section at both the Junior School and the Senior School. They concentrate mainly on team sports which include Football, Cricket, Basketball, Swimming and Athletics with their being both boys’ and girls’ squads in both schools for most age groups.

The students are divided into four houses which compete in all sports throughout the year, giving the coaches the opportunity to select the students for training for the squads.

Football is probably currently the strongest sport. The Under 19 Team has been International Schools Champion several times and has beaten many of the top national schools as well. Both Boys’ and Girls’ Squads compete in Malaysia once a year. The Junior School Squads are very keen and active and have regular matches.

In Cricket, the Boys Under 19 Team were frequently International Schools’ Champion when Rumesh Ratnayake was their coach. They continue to train hard to maintain the standards and compete both in Sri Lanka and abroad.

In Basketball, they have squads for both boys and girls throughout both schools, and they compete with schools and clubs in Sri Lanka as well as in Malaysia.[5]

Moir School has Squads for both Athletics and Swimming consisting of about fifty boys and girls from ages 6 to 18, who train throughout the year and thoroughly enjoy representing the School together at swimming meets with many other Colombo schools at the National Stadiums on 400 metre tracks and in fifty metre pools respectively. Elizabeth Moir School hosts an annual four way Swimming Meet for the four main international schools in Colombo at the fifty metre Air Force Pool in Ratmalana.

The School has had, and still has, several National Athletes and Swimmers who train daily despite their many school commitments. They have also had students who represented Sri Lanka in Rowing, Cricket and Squash.

The Performing and Creative Arts

From an early age, students are encouraged to participate in the Performing and Creative Arts and in doing so they develop both their talents and their confidence. There are very popular and successful programs in Singing, Instrumental Music, Drama, Mime, Dance, Debating and Art.

There are daily Assemblies at both schools, and students get regular practice speaking into a mic and performing in front of an audience.

There are Interhouse Competitions in Singing and Dance, Drama, Debating, General Knowledge,  Film and Art, in the Senior School, and this enables the teachers to select students to represent the school for inter school events.

The Senior School Choir is frequently invited to perform at the Royal College Choirs Festival and also for the Edexcel Awards Ceremony at the BMICH. Every other year they are joined by the Junior and Infant Choirs for Carols at school with Chamber Choirs from Royal and Trinity.

Elizabeth Moir School stages both Junior School and Senior School plays, musicals and concerts  for packed audiences at the Lionel Wendt Theatre, the top theatre in Colombo. Recent successes include the Crucible, A Few Good Men, Annie, Antigone, The Ramayana, Charlie and the Chocolate Factory, Whose Life is it Anyway and Footloose. [6]

Both Junior and Senior Schools have annual Art Exhibitions at the Lionel Wendt and Barefoot Galleries in Colombo.

They have Debating and Quiz Teams who compete regularly with other schools.

School Trips, Internships and Community Service

The Juniors have regular trips throughout the year mainly in the Colombo area.

There are frequent Senior School  trips to Paris for the French students, Beijing for the Mandarin students, St. John's College Jaffna for the Community Service students, the Cultural Triangle and Ancient Capitals of Sri Lanka for the Middle School History students, the National University of Singapore for the Advanced Level Science students, and Malaysia and soon Thailand for the Football, Cricket and Basketball squads. Leadership Camps with white water rafting, abseiling and other adventure sports are organized at Kitulgala and elsewhere for students from Form 4 upwards.

In addition, Senior Students are encouraged to do internships during their holidays and these include, Beijing University, the United Nations in New York, Game Parks in South Africa and Rwanda, a hospital in Colombo for kidney transplant operations, Flying School in Ratmalana, and offices of architects, lawyers. IT firms in Colombo.

All students take part in a Community Service Project with their class every year. In addition, students volunteer to teach English to young boys every week at the Salvation Army Boys’ Home. The Sixth Form has an ongoing project with the Foundation of Goodness near Galle, which is also promoted by Mahela Jayawardena and Kumar Sangakkara. The students also work with the boys of Trinity College Kandy in deprived villages between Colombo and Kandy, under the auspices of Sri Lanka Unites, a student driven project promoting unity in the island.

References

External links

 Official Website

International schools in Sri Lanka
Educational institutions established in 1996
Schools in Colombo
British international schools in Asia
1996 establishments in Sri Lanka